Alan Carr's Happy Hour is a British comedy show, presented by comedian Alan Carr. The programme features celebrity guests, sketches, topical chat and music. The first series consisted of three episodes. The first episode of the first series aired on Channel 4 on 2 December 2016 and the last on 16 December 2016.

Production
In October 2016, it was announced that Channel 4 had commissioned a new pre-watershed show titled Alan Carr: Happy Hour, a spin-off to Alan Carr: Chatty Man, which was cancelled on 9 October 2016 due to low ratings battled against BBC One's The Graham Norton Show, which got higher ratings. Happy Hour was to be similar to Chatty Man, however without interviews with celebrities or alcohol, as Channel 4 wanted to attract a younger audience. There would also be audience surprises and games.

The show aired on Fridays at 8 pm on Channel 4.

Series overview

Episodes

References

External links 
 Alan Carr's Happy Hour on channel4.com

2016 British television series debuts
2016 British television series endings
2010s British comedy television series
British comedy television shows
British television talk shows
Channel 4 comedy
Channel 4 talk shows
English-language television shows
Television series by Hungry Bear Media